No. 8 Operational Training Unit (8OTU) was an operational training unit of the Royal Australian Air Force formed at RAAF Station Narromine, Narromine, New South Wales in 1942.

8OTU moved to RAAF Station Parkes, Parkes, New South Wales in 1944.

8OTU
Parkes Shire